Ricardo Cunningham (born 10 April 1982) is a Jamaican middle-distance runner turned 400 metres hurdler. He represented his country at the 2017 World Championships as well as the 2015 Pan American Games and two Commonwealth Games.

International competitions

1Disqualified in the final

Personal bests

Outdoor
200 metres – 22.85 (Kingston 2012)
400 metres – 46.21 (Uwi mona Kingston)2O12
800 metres – 1:47.14 (San José 2015)
1500 metres – 4:02.66 (Kingston 2014)
400 metres hurdles – 48.83 (Kingston 2017)

Indoor
800 metres – 1:51.46 (Boston 2003)
1000 metres – 2:29.04 (Fairfax 2005)

References

1982 births
Living people
Jamaican male hurdlers
Jamaican male middle-distance runners
World Athletics Championships athletes for Jamaica
Athletes (track and field) at the 2010 Commonwealth Games
Athletes (track and field) at the 2014 Commonwealth Games
Athletes (track and field) at the 2018 Commonwealth Games
Athletes (track and field) at the 2015 Pan American Games
People from Westmoreland Parish
Commonwealth Games competitors for Jamaica
Pan American Games competitors for Jamaica
Competitors at the 2010 Central American and Caribbean Games
20th-century Jamaican people
21st-century Jamaican people